Hermann Kulke (born 1938 in Berlin) is a German historian and Indologist, who was professor of South and Southeast Asian history at the Department of History, Kiel University (1988–2003). After receiving his PhD in Indology from Freiburg University in 1967, he taught for 21 years at the South Asia Institute of Heidelberg University (SAI).

He was a founding member of the Orissa Research Project (ORP) of the Southasia Institute (1970–1975), and was coordinator of the second ORP.

Specialization: pre-colonial South and Southeast Asian History; early state formation and historiography; regional cultures of India with emphasis on Orissa; Indianization of Southeast Asia and Indian Ocean Studies.

He was a visiting professor at Utkal University, Bhubaneswar (1978–1979), Asiatic Society, Calcutta (1986), and Jawaharlal Nehru University, Delhi (1992). He was also the Fellow of the Institute of Southeast Asian Studies, in Singapore (1987) and of the Asia Research Institute of the University of Singapore (2007).

 In 2005 he received the Gold Medal of the Asiatic Society of Kolkata.
 In 2010 he was awarded the order of Padma Shri by the President of India.
 The Order of Merit of the Federal Republic of Germany was awarded to him by the President of Germany in 2011.

Publications
 Cidambaramahatmya (PhD, Wiesbaden 1970)
 The Cult of Jagannath and the Regional Tradition of Orissa (Delhi 1978, with A. Eschmann and G.C. Tripathi)
 The Devaraja Cult (Cornell University 1978)
 Jagannath Cult and Gajapaati Kingship (Jagannatha-Kult und Gajapati-Königtum. Ein Beitrag zur Geschichte religiöser Legitimation hinduistischer Herrscher, D.Litt-Habilitation, Stuttgart 1979, in German)
 A History of India (together with Dietmar Rothermund, German 1982, 5th Engl. ed. 2010)
 Hinduism Reconsidered (Delhi 1989, 2nd ed. 1997, with G.D. Sontheimer)
 Kings and Cults – State Formation and Legitimation in India and Southeast Asia (Delhi 1993)
 Editor of The State in India 1000–1700 (Delhi 1993, 2nd ed. in preparation).
 Indian History until 1750 (Indische Geschichte bis 1750, Munich 2005, Engl. ed. in preparation)
 Co-editor of Nagapatinam to Suvarnadwipa. Reflections on the Chola Naval Expeditions to Southeast Asia (Singapore 2009).
 Co-editor of Centres Out There? Facets of Sub-regional Traditions in Orissa (Delhi 2010)
 Co-editor of Rituals and the State in India (Wiesbaden 2010).
 (Co-editor with G. Berkemer, eds.) Centres out There? Facets of Subregional Identities in Orissa. New Delhi: Manohar, 2011.
 The Katakarajavamsavali: The Colonial Biography of Puri's Sanskrit Chronicle of the Year 1820, in: Indian Historical Review, 38, 2011, pp. 65–76.
 Hindu Medieval Regional Kingdoms, in: Encyclopedia of Hinduism, Vol. IV, ed. by A. Malinar, Leiden (Brill, 2012), pp. 51–72.
 Trade and Politics in Eleventh-Century Bay of Bengal, in: The Trading World of the Indian Ocean, 1500–1800, ed. by Om Prakash (History of Science, Philosophy and Culture in Indian Civilization, gen. ed. D.P. Chattopadhyaya, vol. III, 7). New Delhi: Centre for Studies in Civilization, 2012, pp. 117–132.
 (Co-editor with N. Mohanty, G.N. Dash, D. Pathy, eds.) Imaging Odisha. 2 vols., Prafulla (Jagatsinghpur, 2013).
 Orissa's Regional Tradition and India's Cultural Unity, in: Cultural Unity of India, ed. by S. Bhattacharya, Ramakrishna Mission Institute of Culture (Kolkata 2013), pp. 281–296. 
 Jürgen Lütt (20. September 1940-17. Juli 2012),in: Jahrbuch für Europäische Überseegeschichte, 13, 2013, pp. 220–222.
  Der Maurya-Staat (4. – 2. Jh. v. Chr.): Gesamtindisches Großreich oder Imperium? in: Imperien und Reiche in der Weltgeschichte. Epochenübergreifende und globalhistorische Vergleiche, ed. by M. Gehler und R. Rollinger. Harrassowitz (Wiesbaden, 2014), pp. 503–514.
 Co-editor with A. Eschmann and G.C. Tripathi, eds., The Cult of Jagannath and the Regional Tradition of Orissa. Revised and enlarged edition, Manohar, (New Delhi, 2014).
 From Ashoka to Jayavarman VII: Some Reflections on the Relationship between Buddhism and the State in India and Southeast Asia. in:Buddhism Across Asia: Networks of Material, Intellectual and Cultural Exchange, ed. By Tansen Sen, Singapore: Institute of Southeast Asian Studies: Manohar, (Delhi 2014), pp. 327– 346. (slightly revised version reprinted in 2014 as Occasional Paper 56, by the India International Centre, New Delhi).
  (Co-editor with George Coedès, Louis-Charles Damais dan Pierre-Yves Manguin), Kedatuan Sriwijaya. Kajian Sumber Prasasti da Arkeologi, Jakarta, École francaise d’Extrême-Orient, Pusat Arkeologi Nasional Komunitas Bambu, 2014.
 ‘Kadātuan Śrīvijaya’ – Imperium atau Kraton Śrīvijaya? Tinjauan Kewmbali Bukti Epigrafis, in: ibid, pp. 281–314. (Bahasa Indonesia translation of the English article of 1993).
 The Concept of Cultural Convergence Revisited: Reflections on India's Early Influence in Southeast Asia, in: Asian Encounters: Exploring Connected Histories, eds. Upendra Singh and Parul Pandya Dhar, Oxford University Press (New Delhi, 2014), pp. 1–24.
 (together with C.P. Nanda) Rethinking Local History and Identity Politics. Locating Kurmi Community in Odisha, Manohar, (Delhi, 2014).
 (together with B.P. Sahu), eds., Interrogating Political Systems. Integrative Processes and the States in Pre-modern India, Oxford University Press (Delhi, 2014).

In print:

 The State in India 1000–1700, (ed.), revised and enlarged second edition, Delhi: Oxford University Press. 
 History of Pre-colonial India: Issues and Debates, (revised English edition of Indische Geschichte bis 1750, München: Oldenbourg Verlag. München 2003), revised and edited by B.P.Sahu, translated by P. Chirmuley, Oxford University Press, Delhi.
 State Formation and Social Integration in Pre-Islamic South and Southeast Asia. A Reconsideration of Historiographic Concepts and Archaeological Discoveries (Commentator's Report on Section 2 and 3) Paper of the Second International Symposium of Inter-Asia Research Networks, Tokyo: Toyo Bunko, 8–9 March 2014, in: State Formation and Social Integration in Pre-modern South and Southeast Asia. A Comparative Study of Asian Society, ed. by Karashima and M. Hirosue, Manohar, New Delhi.
 Invented Histories? Reflections on Medieval Historiography in Orissa and Vijayanagara, in: Prof. B.D. Chattopadhyaya Felicitation Volume, ed. by Suchandra Ghosh.
 The Development of R.S. Sharma's Concept of Indian Feudalism: Some Historiographic Reflections, in: R.S. Sharma Commemoration Volume, ed. by K.M. Shrimali, Delhi: Tulika Books and Social Scientist (Modern Indian Thinkers Series).
 Looking for Yayati Kesari: Reflections on Puri's Temple Chronicles, in: History, Culture and Society in Odisha, ed. by N. Mohanty. (Souvenir Volume of the Indian History Congress at Cuttack/Odisha, December 2013, pp. 56–68).

Under preparation:
 Angkor. Verlag Beck (München)

References

Sources
S. Conerman, J.Kusber, (eds.) Studia Eurasiatica. Kieler Festschrift für Hermann Kulke (2003)
Schnepel, Burkhard; Berkemer, Georg: History of the Model, in: Berkemer, Georg; Frenz, Margret (eds.), Sharing Sovereignty – The Little Kingdom in South Asia, Berlin 2003
Berkemer, Georg; Frenz, Margret: The Role of Hermann Kulke, in: Berkemer, Georg; Frenz, Margret (eds.), Sharing Sovereignty – The Little Kingdom in South Asia, Berlin 2003
M.Brandtner, S.K.Panda (eds.), Interrogating History. Essays for Hermann Kulke (2006)

External links
http://www.bagchee.com/books.php?id=4271
https://web.archive.org/web/20080503214300/http://www.histosem.uni-kiel.de/personen/kulke.html
http://timesofindia.indiatimes.com/india/List-of-Padma-Award-winners/articleshow/5499401.cms
Bibliography Hermann Kulke 1962–2013: http://www.histsem.uni-kiel.de/de/personalverzeichnis/Professuren/publikationen_kulke
Interview in Frontline:http://www.frontline.in/arts-and-culture/from-classical-indology-to-rigorous-social-science/article7392035.ece

1938 births
20th-century German historians
Living people
Officers Crosses of the Order of Merit of the Federal Republic of Germany
Recipients of the Padma Shri in literature & education
German male non-fiction writers
German Indologists
21st-century German historians